The TurnTable End of the Year Top 100 of 2022 is a chart that ranks the best-performing singles in Nigeria. Its data, published by TurnTable magazine, is based collectively on each single's weekly physical and digital sales, as well as airplay and streaming. At the end of a year, TurnTable publishes an annual list of the 100 most successful songs throughout that year on its top 100 charts based on the information published on 22 December 2022 in TurnTable, and calculated with data from January 3, 2022, to December 12, 2022.

TurnTable named Asake the top Artist of 2022, making him the first artist to achieve this honor, following the expansion of the Top 50 into 100. Asake placed twelve songs on the list, with the highest ranked of them "Sungba (Remix)" at number four. Asake debut studio album Mr. Money with the Vibe, became the first album to debut at number one on the newly launched album chart, and Asake "Peace Be Unto You (PBUY)" became the first song to debut at number one, following the expansion of the single chart from 50 to 100.

Year-end list

References

Nigeria TurnTable
TurnTable charts
Nigerian record charts
2022 in Nigerian music